Live at Brixton is the second live album by Australian indie rock band DMA's. The album was announced in January 2021 with a release date of 5 March 2021, arriving on the one-year anniversary of the sold out namesake concert.

Upon announcement, the band told Triple J "We've got a lot of messages from people saying that was the last time they went out before it got a bit weird" and while the band has hosted online screenings of the performance throughout 2020, they gave into fan demand and gave the show an official release.

Track listing
Adapted from Apple Music.

Personnel
DMA's
 Thomas O'Dell – vocals
 Matthew Mason – guitar, vocals
 Johnny Took – acoustic guitar

Charts

References

2021 live albums
DMA's live albums